Carole Caroompas (1946 – July 31, 2022) was an American painter known for work which examined the intersection of pop culture and gender archetypes.

Early life and education
Carole Caroompas was born in Oregon City, Oregon, and spent her childhood in Newport Beach, California.

Caroompas earned a B.A. from California State University, Fullerton and an M.F.A. from the University of Southern California.  She taught fine art courses at Otis College of Art and Design in Los Angeles.

Awards and fellowships

Caroompas' awards included grants from the Adolph and Esther Gottlieb Foundation, COLA (City of L.A.), two from the National Endowment for the Arts and a California Community Foundation Fellowship. In 1995 she was awarded a Guggenheim Fellowship.

Selected exhibitions

Caroompas exhibited at the Ben Maltz Gallery in Los Angeles, the Whitney Museum of American Art, LACMA, the Museum of Modern Art in New York, Western Project in Culver City, Mark Moore in Santa Monica, P.P.O.W. in New York, Sue Spaid Fine Art, the Hammer Museum at UCLA, and the Corcoran Gallery of Art in Washington, DC.

1994: "Before and After Frankenstein: The Woman Who Knew Too Much" at Sue Spaid Fine Art, Los Angeles, California

1998: "Carole Caroompas: Lady of the Castle Perilous" at Otis College of Art and Design, Los Angeles, California

1999: “Heathcliff and the Femme Fatale go on Tour” at the Mark Moore Gallery in Santa Monica, California

2008: "Dancing with Misfits: Eye-Dazzler” at Western Project, Culver City, California

2015: "Lore and Behold: The Art of Carole Caroompas" at Pasadena City College

Personal life 
Caroompas died in 2022, from Alzheimer's disease, at the age of 76.

References

External links 
 Simmering Talent in O.C. Suburbs
 Interview from Netropolitan.org
 

1946 births
2022 deaths
American contemporary painters
Otis College of Art and Design faculty
American women painters
Painters from California
21st-century American women artists
American women academics
Deaths from Alzheimer's disease
People from Oregon City, Oregon